"Green, Green" is a hit single released by American folk music group The New Christy Minstrels on June 4, 1963. It was composed and written by group members Barry McGuire and Randy Sparks and became the group's first hit. Since then, it has been covered by many singers and artists from all over the world.

Charts 

"Green, Green" sold over one million copies in 1963, and was awarded a gold disc.  It was nominated in 1964 for the Grammy Award for Best Folk Recording and Best Performance By A Chorus.

Variants, covers and sampling 
The New Christy Minstrels also recorded the song in German, named Grün, grün ist Tennessee.

Green, Green has been covered by many artists from all over the world including:

Eddy Arnold and the Needmore Creek Singers  - Green Green
Brian Hyland - Green Green
Mrs. Green Apple - グリーン グリーン
Glen Campbell - Green Green
Drafi Deutscher - Grün, grün ist Tennessee
Cliff Richard - Du, Du Gefällst Mir So
Dalinda - Ding Ding
Ann-Louise Hanson - Ding Ding
Rangers - Vim Vim
Georg Dolivo - Maantie
Bruce Low - Grün, Drün
Bjørn Tidmand  - Blå, Blå
Johnny Rivers  - Green Green
The song also served as a possible inspiration for the Super Mario World soundtrack by the Japanese composer Koji Kondo.

Japanese version 
Poet and children's literature author Hikaru Kataoka took notice of the song in the 1960s. At this time he was working for the Japanese public broadcaster NHK, where he was in charge of production, song writing and translation. He wrote new Japanese lyrics for "Green, Green", and in May 1967, it was broadcast on NHK during the children's programme Minna no Uta (Songs for Everyone) sung by Suginami Junior Chorus and arranged by Akihiro Komori. Since then the lyrics have become very popular in Japan. 

The lyrics have been published in several Japanese music textbooks.

References

External links 
 
 
 

1963 singles
1963 songs
Minna no Uta
Trini Lopez songs
American folk songs